Christophe Boesch (born 11 August 1951 in St. Gallen, Switzerland) is a primatologist who studies chimpanzees. He and his wife work together, and he has both written articles and directed documentaries about chimpanzees.

He is of French and Swiss nationality. He received his degree in biology from the University of Geneva, and his Ph.D. from the University of Zurich in 1984. His dissertation was entitled "Nut-Cracking Behaviour of Wild Chimpanzees". After this, he attended the University of Basel, to receive a degree in habilitation in 1994.

Boesch's first field experience was in 1973, conducting census work on the mountain gorillas of Virunga National Park in Rwanda, under the supervision of Dian Fossey. In 1975 and 1977 he taught at a secondary school in Geneva; followed by time as an assistant in the Department of Ethology and Wildlife Research at the University of Zurich. In 1976, Boesch began his work with chimpanzees at Taï National Park in Côte d'Ivoire. One of his current ongoing projects was begun in 1979, studying the "ecology, social organization, tool-use, hunting, cooperation, food-sharing, inter-community relationships, and cognitive capacities" of the chimpanzees at Taï National Park.

Since 1997, he has been the Director of the Department of Primatology of the Max Planck Institute for Evolutionary Anthropology in Leipzig, Germany. He is also the founder and president of the Wild Chimpanzee Foundation.

Boesch and several other scientists have found evidence about how easily disease can be passed from human tourists and researchers to the great apes they are observing; this research has helped to make great ape tourism more hygienic.

Boesch and his colleagues at the Max Planck Institute for Evolutionary Anthropology have also contributed to our understanding of chimpanzee mating habits through collection and analysis of chimpanzee DNA.

References

External links

Video 
 Video on Christophe Boesch's research (Latest Thinking)

Primatologists
French biologists
Swiss biologists
1951 births
Living people
People from St. Gallen (city)
Max Planck Institute for Evolutionary Anthropology
Max Planck Institute directors